Đerekari is a village in the municipality of Brus, Serbia. According to the 2002 census, the village has a population of 23 people.

References

Populated places in Rasina District